Sinclair Buchanan Ferguson (born 21 February 1948) is a Scottish theologian known in Reformed Christian circles for his teaching, writing, and editorial work. He has been Chancellor's Professor of Systematic Theology at Reformed Theological Seminary since 2017, commuting from Scotland, where he is an assistant minister at St. Peter's Free Church of Scotland, Dundee. He is currently a preaching associate at Trinity Church, Aberdeen

Career
Ferguson studied at the University of Aberdeen for all of his university education, earning first a master of arts, then a bachelor of divinity, before gaining his Ph.D. During his days as a student, he worshiped at Gilcomston South Church, under the ministry of William Still.

Ferguson was ordained as a minister in the Church of Scotland in 1971, becoming the minister of St. John's, Baltasound, the most northerly parish in Scotland, on the island of Unst, Shetland. He was the pastor there for 10 years. After his service on Unst, he was offered a teaching position as a part-time Professor of Systematic Theology at Westminster Theological Seminary, Philadelphia.

He then moved back to his native Scotland in 1997, filling the pulpit at St George's-Tron Church, Glasgow, succeeding the 20-year ministry of Eric Alexander.

In the mid-2000s, he then transferred back to the US to the Associate Reformed Presbyterian Church, serving as the senior pastor of historic First Presbyterian Church of Columbia, South Carolina.

From 25 August 2013, he has served as a preacher and elder at St. Peter's Free Church, Dundee.

In 2022, a Festschrift was published in his honor. Theology for Ministry: How Doctrine Affects Pastoral Life and Practice includes contributions from Joel Beeke, Ligon Duncan, W. Robert Godfrey, Michael Horton, Douglas Kelly, Robert Letham, Philip Ryken, and Chad Van Dixhoorn.

Other Roles 
Ferguson has served as an editor with the Banner of Truth Trust.

He was also a professor of systematic theology at Redeemer Seminary in Dallas.

He has held the Charles Krahe Chair for Systematic Theology at Westminster Theological Seminary.

He also previously served as a council member of the Alliance of Confessing Evangelicals.

He serves as a Teaching Fellow for Ligonier Ministries.

Works
Ferguson speaks at numerous conferences worldwide. Books he has written, edited, or contributed to include:
 Know Your Christian Life (1981) 
 Kingdom Life in a Fallen World - Living Out the Sermon on the Mount (1986) 
 John Owen on the Christian Life (1987) 
 New Dictionary of Theology (Master Reference Collection) (1988) , editor with David Wright and J. I. Packer
 Daniel (Mastering the Old Testament, Vol 19) (1988) 
 Grow in Grace (1989) 
 Children of the Living God (1989) 
 A Heart for God (1996) 
 The Christian Life (1996) 
 Discovering God's Will (1996) 
 Sermon on the Mount (1996) 
 The Pundit's Folly (1996) 
 Big Book of Questions and Answers (1997) 
 The Holy Spirit (1997) 
 Let's Study Philippians (1998) 
 Reformed Confessions Harmonized (1999) , editor with Joel Beeke
 Let's Study Mark (1999) 
 The Big Book of Questions & Answers about Jesus (2000) 
 The Grace of Repentance (Today's Issues) (2000) 
 The Preacher's Commentary - Vol. 21 - Daniel (2002) 
 John Owen: The Man and His Theology (2003) , contributor about John Owen
 Let's Study Ephesians (2005) 
 Faithful God - An exposition of the book of Ruth (2005) 
 In Christ Alone: Living the Gospel Centered Life (2007)
By Grace Alone: How the Grace of God Amazes me (2010) 
The Grace of Repentance (Redesign) (Today's Issues) (2011) 
The Christian Life: A Doctrinal Introduction (2013)  
Name above All Names (2013) with Alistair Begg 
Deserted by God (2013) 
The Whole Christ: Legalism, Antinomianism, & Gospel Assurance--Why the Marrow Controversy Still Matters (2016)

References

External links
The Tron Church, Glasgow, formerly St George's-Tron Church
Redeemer Seminary
Alliance of Confessing Evangelicals
First Presbyterian Church - Columbia, SC
St. Peter's Free Church, Dundee
Biographical Sketch
Lectures on the Westminster Standards

1948 births
Living people
Scottish Calvinist and Reformed theologians
Westminster Theological Seminary faculty
Alumni of the University of Aberdeen
20th-century Ministers of the Church of Scotland
21st-century Ministers of the Free Church of Scotland
20th-century Calvinist and Reformed theologians
21st-century Calvinist and Reformed theologians
Scottish evangelicals
Bible commentators
21st-century Ministers of the Church of Scotland